Mohammad Sharif Razai is a physician, poet, author and researcher. He was awarded the 2021 John Maddox Prize as an early career researcher, by Sense about Science and Nature for his work on racial health inequalities.

Early life and education 
Razai was born in Afghanistan and came to the UK when he was 14. He studied medicine at the University of Cambridge.

Career 
Razai works as a medical doctor in the UK's National Health Service, and as a researcher at St George's University of London.

Razai's writings deal with health inequalities in particular during the COVID-19 pandemic. Mohammad Razai is also a published poet and has written for the Poetry Review, Brittle Stars, Tears in the Fence, Under the Radar , Brixton Review of Books and other poetry magazines. He also contributes to the BMJ Opinion regularly on a wide range of topics.

Awards and honours
Razai was awarded the John Maddox Prize in 2021 as an early career research. In 2021, there were over 100 nominations from across 23 countries, with the winners announced in a ceremony at the Wellcome Collection. The winners were chosen by an international panel of judges and were presented their awards following comments from Tracey Brown, director of Sense about Science, Nature editor-in-chief Magdalena Skipper and Bronwen Maddox, daughter of the late John Maddox. On receiving the award, Razai paid tribute to family members who had just fled Afghanistan. "No matter what obstacles and challenges we may face as scientists in the global north, it is not the same as Afghan scientists, especially women and those from racial minorities, who literally pay with their lives in speaking truth and standing up for their rights," he said. "I remember them and dedicate this prize to them."

In 2021, he received St George's University's excellence in public/civic engagement research award for his work to tackle ethnic and societal health disparities and inequalities.

Razai also received an award during his training as a doctor for his work during the COVID-19 pandemic by Pulse magazine.

In 2021, he was awarded a research fellowship by the National Institute for Health and Care Research (NIHR).

Selected publications
 Razai, Mohammad Sharif; Oakeshott, Pippa; Kankam, Hadyn et al. (21 May 2020). Mitigating the psychological effects of social isolation during the COVID-19 pandemic BMJ 2020; 369 :m1904 doi:10.1136/bmj.m1904
 Razai Mohammad Sharif, Kankam H K N, Majeed A, Esmail A, Williams D R. (15 January 2021) Mitigating ethnic disparities in COVID-19 and beyond BMJ 2021; 372 :m4921 doi:10.1136/bmj.m4921
 Razai, Mohammad Sharif, Oakeshott Pippa, Esmail A, Wiysonge CS, Viswanath K, Mills MC. COVID-19 vaccine hesitancy: the five Cs to tackle behavioural and sociodemographic factors. Journal of the Royal Society of Medicine. 2021;114(6):295-298. doi:10.1177/01410768211018951
 Razai, Mohammad Sharif, Doerholt K, Galiza E, Oakeshott P. Tick bite BMJ  2020;  370 :m3029 doi:10.1136/bmj.m3029
 Razai, Mohammad Sharif, Chaudhry U A R, Doerholt K, Bauld L, Majeed A. COVID-19 vaccination hesitancy BMJ  2021; 373 :n1138 doi:10.1136/bmj.n1138
 Elise Paul, Daisy Fancourt, Mohammad Sharif Razai. (05 May 2022). Racial discrimination, low trust in the health system and COVID-19 vaccine uptake: a longitudinal observational study of 633 UK adults from ethnic minority groups. Journal of the Royal Society of Medicine.

References 

John Maddox Prize recipients
Academics of St George's, University of London
Alumni of the University of Cambridge
People from Kabul
Year of birth missing (living people)
Living people
Afghan diaspora in Europe
Health equity
20th-century Afghan poets
Afghan medical writers
21st-century Afghan poets